Trump Towers Pune are two 23-story towers of condominiums in the city of Pune, Maharashtra, India. The building has one apartment on each floor.

Overview
Despite its name, the Trump Towers Pune property is not owned by or developed by The Trump Organization, and it has not invested any money in the project. The project has received the rights to use the name "Trump" under a real estate licensing deal with Trump. The exact terms of the deal are not public.

The "Trump Towers Pune" project is the subject of two investigations by the Pune state government and local police after discrepancies were found in documents related to the land on which the luxury apartment block is being built.

In November 2016, the then President-elect of the United States Trump met with three Indian property developers, Sunil and Atul Chordia (his business partners on the Trump Towers Pune project) and Kalpesh Mehta (another Indian businessman), at Trump Tower in New York, raising concerns about potential conflicts of interest arising from his dual roles as a businessman and president.

On 30 November 2016, Politico reported that an individual working for the building's developer told BuzzFeed that the building is taking precautionary measures since the 2016 United States presidential election.

See also
The Park (residential project) — includes Trump Tower Mumbai
List of tallest buildings in Pune

References

External links
https://www.trumptowerspune.com/pune/apartments-in-kalyani-nagar 
https://www.trump.com/real-estate-portfolio/india/trump-towers-pune/
https://vtpearth-one.com

Buildings and structures in Pune
Residential buildings in India
The Trump Organization